Shaka-ike is an earthfill dam located in Akita Prefecture in Japan. The dam is used for irrigation. The catchment area of the dam is 7.1 km2. The dam impounds about 23  ha of land when full and can store 1500 thousand cubic meters of water. The construction of the dam was completed in 1943.

References

Dams in Akita Prefecture
1943 establishments in Japan